Bass Pond Site (38CH124) is a historic archaeological site located at Kiawah Island, Charleston County, South Carolina. Excavations indicate that at least two separate human occupations are represented: a Formative period settlement (ca. 3,800 B.P.) and a Middle Woodland settlement (ca. 2,800 B.P.). Both of the occupations occur in the shell midden. It was listed on the National Register of Historic Places in 1979.

References

Archaeological sites on the National Register of Historic Places in South Carolina
Buildings and structures in Charleston County, South Carolina
National Register of Historic Places in Charleston County, South Carolina